Trebein is an unincorporated community in Beavercreek Township, Greene County, in the U.S. state of Ohio.

History
A post office called Trebeins was established in 1878, and remained in operation until 1910. The community was named for F. C. Trebein, the proprietor of a distillery and mill.

The community has in the past also been known variously as Beaver, Beaver Station, Frost Station, Pickeneyville/Pinckneyvile/Pinkneyville, Trebins and Treibeins.

References

Unincorporated communities in Greene County, Ohio
1878 establishments in Ohio
Populated places established in 1878
Unincorporated communities in Ohio